Stokksundet is a sound between the islands of Stord and Bømlo in Vestland county, Norway. The Digernessundet is a small strait on the south end that connects the Stokksundet to the vast Hardangerfjorden. On the southern end of the strait, the Stord Bridge and Bømla Bridge cross the sound, connecting the islands of Stord and Bømlo to the Bømlafjord Tunnel as part of the Triangle Link which connects both islands to the mainland.

References

Sounds of Vestland
Stord
Bømlo